The KSV Ice Tigers are an ice hockey team in Kapfenberg, Austria that play in the Austrian National League, the second level of ice hockey in Austria.
The club was founded as the KSV Ice Stars in 2002. The name was changed to the KSV Ice Tigers in 2005.

External links
Official site

Ice hockey teams in Austria
Austrian National League teams
Ice hockey clubs established in 2002
2002 establishments in Austria